TV9 Marathi is a Marathi language news channel based in Mumbai, Maharashtra, India. It was launched as TV9 Mumbai in 2009, and was renamed to TV9 Marathi in 2012.

References

Television channels and stations established in 2009
24-hour television news channels in India
Marathi-language television channels
Television stations in Mumbai
TV9 Group